William W. Hughes   (1860 – December 2, 1928), was a first baseman/outfielder and pitcher in Major League Baseball  who played for the 1884 Washington Nationals of the Union Association and the 1885 Philadelphia Athletics of the American Association.

External links
Baseball Reference – major league profile
Baseball Reference – minor league career
Retrosheet entry

1860 births
1928 deaths
Major League Baseball first basemen
Major League Baseball outfielders
Major League Baseball pitchers
Baseball players from Illinois
19th-century baseball players
Washington Nationals (UA) players
Philadelphia Athletics (AA) players
Peoria Reds players
Norfolk (minor league baseball) players
Dayton (minor league baseball) players
Burials at Green-Wood Cemetery